The 2011 PV Gas Vietnamese Super Cup Final was the 13th edition of the Vietnamese Super Cup. It featured the winners of the 2011 V-League, Sông Lam Nghệ An, and the winners of the 2011 Vietnamese Cup, Navibank Sài Gòn. This edition was sponsored by Petrovietnam Gas (PV Gas) and was known as 2011 PV Gas Vietnamese Super Cup.
 
Sông Lam Nghệ An featured in 3rd Super Cup and Navibank Sài Gòn played in the fixture for fist time.

The game finished goalless after 90 minutes, and Sông Lam Nghệ An won 3–1 on penalties for their fourth Super Cup victory.

Match details

See also 
2011 V-League
2011 Vietnamese Cup

References 

Vietnamese Super Cup
Super